The four-man bobsleigh results at the 1936 Winter Olympics in Garmisch-Partenkirchen, Germany. The competition was held on Tuesday and Wednesday, 11 and 12 February 1936.

Medallists

Results

References

External links
1936 bobsleigh four-man results

Bobsleigh at the 1936 Winter Olympics